The SC 1000 (Sprengbombe Cylindrisch 1000) or cylindrical explosive bomb was a large air-dropped general-purpose thin-cased high explosive demolition bomb used by Germany during World War II.

Design
In December 1941, the bomb had a body of drawn steel to which a heavy pointed nose cone was welded. At the other end was a base plate, just forward of which the magnesium alloy tail was tack welded onto the body, and also bolted to the tail attachment brace. Around the nose of the bomb was a kopfring - a metal ring, triangular in cross section, designed to prevent ground penetration or to stop forward momentum when hitting water. The bomb was attached to the aircraft horizontally by a H-type suspension lug.

The bomb was fitted with a single transverse fuse pocket. The bomb was usually filled with a mixture of 40% amatol and 60% Trotyl, but when used as an anti-shipping bomb it was filled with Trialen 105, a mixture of 15% hexogen, 70% Trotyl and 15% aluminium powder. A central exploder tube of high-grade TNT was put down the centre of the explosive to ensure high order detonation.

The bombs were painted sky-blue with a yellow stripe in the tail cone, unless filled with Trialen in which case it was replaced by the silhouette of a sinking ship in yellow, and the warning Nur gegen Handelsschiffe ("only against merchant ships") was stencilled on the bomb casing.

Variants
There were three variants of the bomb, designated Type C, L and L2, all of the same design, but which varied slightly in size and weight.

Fuses
The bomb was fitted with a variety of fuses including:
 Type 25B electric impact fuse. This could be set to instantaneous detonation, short delay (less than 1 second), or for a 17-second delay.

 Type 28B, 38 and 38A electric impact fuse, designed for use against shipping.

Post-war unexploded bombs
Unexploded ordnance can pose a risk of explosion even after a century or more, and some can explode fully if disturbed or even spontaneously. Many unexploded devices from the Second World War are found until this day, including Hermann bombs in Europe, requiring evacuation of people nearby while they are dealt with. They must sometimes be destroyed by detonation if no safer way is possible, and may cause damage despite precautions.

London 2008
In early June 2008 an SC 1000 bomb was dredged from the River Lea near Three Mills Island in London, the largest bomb found in 30 years. The explosive charge was liquefied and pumped out using steam by bomb disposal experts from the Royal Engineers, exposing the detonator, which was made safe with a small detonation after five days. The always-present risk of a full detonation was avoided.

Szczecin 2013
In June 2013, an SC 1000 bomb was recovered from the Odra in central Szczecin, Poland. The area was evacuated while the bomb was lifted from the river by military engineers, and then taken in convoy to an Army training base near Drawsko Pomorskie to be destroyed in a controlled explosion.

Belgrade 2013
In early December, an SC1000 bomb was recovered in the inner city of Belgrade. The area was evacuated while the bomb was lifted by the engineers of the Department for the Unexploded Ordnance of the Sector for Emergency Management of the Ministry of Interior, and then taken in a convoy to an Army training base at Nikinci to be destroyed in a controlled explosion.

Exeter 2021
On 26 February 2021 an unexploded SC1000 bomb was found by builders near the University of Exeter in Exeter in the United Kingdom. A major incident was declared, residents were evacuated, a 400-meter evacuation zone was established, and a controlled detonation was performed on 27 February. Despite precautions, houses within 100m were damaged, a large crater was formed, and debris was thrown 250m away.

Hauerseter leir 2022
On 30 November 2022, an unarmed SC1000 bomb was found by using a metal detector in a small lake known for previously containing miscellaneous artifacts from the past. The bomb is said to be in "pristine" condition by being preserved in an unusually low oxygen environment.

Rijeka 2023
On the 19 March 2023 Croatian port city of Rijeka was partly evacuated, complete marine traffic was stopped while the bomb was draged from the port to the middle of the Kvarner bay and safely detonated.

See also 
 List of weapons of military aircraft of Germany during World War II

Photo gallery

References
Notes

Bibliography
 

World War II aerial bombs of Germany